Alejandro Meleán Villarroel (born June 16, 1987) is an American-born Bolivian professional football player who currently plays for Jorge Wilstermann in the Bolivian Liga de Fútbol Profesional Boliviano.

Club career

Early life 
Melean attended Palmer Trinity School in Miami, where he played soccer and graduated in 2005. Later Meleán enrolled at College of the Holy Cross in Worcester, MA after high school. During his four years with the Holy Cross Crusaders, Meleán was named all-Patriot League Conference twice and all Mid-Atlantic in his final year. Upon graduation, Meleán attempted to trial with numerous MLS squads, but after not finding any success, he returned to his native Miami.

Move to Bolivia 
While home in Miami, Meleán secured trials with clubs in Bolivia. After a successful trial with Blooming, Meleán was offered a contract. Unhappy with terms of the contract, Meleán decided to join La Paz. His performances with La Paz garnered interest from then champions, Oriente Petrolero.

Meleán joined Oriente Petrolero in 2011 as cover for the club ahead of their 2011 Copa Libertadores campaign.

International career
Meleán made his debut for Bolivia in an October 2012 FIFA World Cup qualification match against Uruguay and has, as of 20 June 2016, earned a total of 15 caps, scoring no goals.

References

External links

 

1987 births
Living people
People with acquired Bolivian citizenship
Bolivian footballers
Bolivia international footballers
American people of Bolivian descent
Soccer players from Miami
Holy Cross Crusaders men's soccer players
La Paz F.C. players
Oriente Petrolero players
American soccer players
Association football midfielders